The seal of the City of Portland in Oregon was originally adopted in 1878, standardized in 1964, and most recently revised August 3, 2005. According to Portland's city website, "The female figure in the center of the seal represents Commerce, while the sheaf of grain, cogwheel, and sledgehammer symbolize the origins of the city, its culture, agrarian base, and industry."

History
The seal's symbolism was discussed upon its adoption by the Morning Oregonian of March 22, 1878 on page 3: 

From the 1920s to 1964, the Queen of Commerce on the seal faced forward, towards the observer. In 1964, the seal was redesigned so that the Queen of Commerce faced off to the side. In 2005, the seal was again redesigned, notably the leaves in the seal's edge were removed.

Legacy
Portland's landmark statue Portlandia is based on the figure of Commerce in the seal.

See also
 Flag of Portland, Oregon

References

External links

1878 establishments in Oregon
Coats of arms with stars
Coats of arms with cogwheels
Coats of arms with ships
Coats of arms with trees
Coats of arms with wheat
Coats of arms with hammers
Coats of arms with mountains
Seal
Municipal heraldry of the United States
Official seals of places in Oregon